Combat Outpost Shocker (COP Shocker) was a United States Coalition base in Zurbatiyah, a city in southern Iraq that is located a few miles from Iran The base is located parallel to Iraqi 3rd Region BDE Department of Border Enforcement (DBE). Assigned to the base were a contingent of Iraq Assistance Group Military transition teams, United States Border Patrol and U.S. Canine unit.

Rocket attack
On 29 June 2011, Iranian-backed Kata'ib Hezbollah, also known as the Hezbollah Brigades fired IRAM rockets that struck COP Shocker.(Video of the attack) The attack resulted in the deaths of three Army soldiers, Captain Matthew G. Nielson, Captain David E. Van Camp and Sergeant Robert G. Tenney Jr.

Transfer of base
On 30 July 2011, the United States military turned over responsibility of COP Shocker to the Iraqi 3rd Region BDE Department of Border Enforcement (DBE).

References

External links 
U.S. Building Military Base Near Iraqi-Iranian Border
3-1 Cav. Regt. Soldiers are in it together at COP Shocker
Dust, Wind and Land Mines: Fighting Smugglers on the Iran-Iraq Border
US BUILDING MILITARY BASE NEAR IRAQI-IRANIAN BORDER 
Weapons stockpiles destroyed near Iranian border
War Inches Closer to Iran
Iran-Iraq Border not Properly Manned
Iraq rocket attack kills three American soldiers
COP Shocker receives new entertainment system 

Shocker, Combat Outpost
Wasit Governorate